The 11447 / 11448 Shaktipunj Express is a daily express train which runs between Jabalpur Junction railway station of Jabalpur, a major city in Madhya Pradesh, and Howrah Junction railway station of Kolkata, the capital city of West Bengal state in India. It link in four states of India West Bengal, Jharkhand, Uttar Pradesh, Madhya Pradesh.

Background

The name Shaktipunj may be attributed to two reasons. Firstly, initially when the train service started, it connected Shaktinagar to Howrah. Later on the route got extended up to Singrauli junction and then to Jabalpur subsequently. The name Shaktinagar inspired the name Shaktipunj. Secondly, the train passes through the important coal mining belts such as Karnpura mines (near Khalari), Ramgarh mines (near Barkakana), Singrauli, Bokaro, Dhanbad, Asansol, Raniganj etc. and many important thermal power stations like Chandrapura, Patratu, Bokaro etc. Coal is the source of energy or "Shakti".
Hence the name of this train is given "Shaktipunj".
Its famous among the businessmen who travel from Howrah to Asansol.

Coaches
The 11447 / 48 Shaktipunj Express has 1 First class AC coach, 2 AC 2 tier, 3 AC 3 tier, 7 Sleeper class, 4 General Unreserved & 2 SLR (Seating cum Luggage Rake) coaches. It does not carry a pantry car.

As is customary with most train services in India, coach composition may be amended at the discretion of Indian Railways depending on demand.

Service

Routeing

Traction

Direction reversal 

The train reverses its direction 2 times:

References

External links
11447 Shaktipunj Express at India Rail Info
11448 Shaktipunj Express at India Rail Info

Named passenger trains of India
Rail transport in Madhya Pradesh
Transport in Kolkata
Transport in Jabalpur
Rail transport in West Bengal
Rail transport in Jharkhand
Rail transport in Uttar Pradesh
Express trains in India